Inguromorpha polybioides is a moth, of the family Cossidae. It is found in Brazil (Parana).

References

Natural History Museum Lepidoptera generic names catalog

Hypoptinae